Arcangelo Califano (fl. 1730s–1756) was a baroque composer and cellist. He played in the orchestra of the Dresden Hofkapelle. His surviving compositions include sonatas for double reeds and basso continuo.

References

External links
 

Italian Baroque composers
Italian male classical composers
18th-century Italian composers
18th-century Italian male musicians